Robert Dale Patchett (born April 21, 1950) was an American politician in the state of Florida.  Patchett plead nolo contendre to ethics charges that he received unauthorized compensation as a legislator; Leon County Court Case No. 91-5209AMI, and 91-5211. Patchett v. Commission on Ethics, 626 SO. 2d 319 (Fla. 1st DCA 1993), Patchett entered the plea on March 15, 1994, and left the House of Representatives.

Patchett was born in Indiana and came to Florida in 1973. He is a real estate broker and environmental consultant. He served in the Florida House of Representatives for the 48th district from 1976 to 1990, as a Republican.

References

1950 births
Living people
Politicians from Terre Haute, Indiana
Businesspeople from Florida
Republican Party members of the Florida House of Representatives